The 1966–67 Houston Cougars men's basketball team represented the University of Houston in the 1966–67 NCAA University Division men's basketball season.  The team played its home games at Delmar Fieldhouse in Houston for the first time.  This season marked the team's eighth year as an independent member of the NCAA's University Division.  Houston was led by eleventh-year head coach Guy Lewis.

At the conclusion of the regular season, the Cougars finished with a 23–3 overall record. Additionally, they finished seventh in the AP Poll, sixth in the Coaches Poll, were invited to the NCAA tournament, and finished as a third place semifinalist. It was Houston's first ever Final Four appearance.

Roster

Schedule

|-
!colspan=7|Regular season

|-
!colspan=7|NCAA tournament

 Schedule missing games.

Rankings

References

NCAA Division I men's basketball tournament Final Four seasons
Houston Cougars men's basketball seasons
Houston
Houston
Houston